Kazakhstan is a nation that has competed at two Hopman Cup tournaments and first competed in the 22nd Hopman Cup in 2010. Its best result to date is finishing second in their group in 2010.

Before its dissolution, Kazakhstan used to form part of the Soviet Union which also competed at the Hopman Cup on two occasions in the early 1990s. Additionally, Kazakhstan is a member of the CIS which entered a team into the 1992 event.

Kazakhstan also participated a number of times in the now defunct Asian Hopman Cup, a qualifying tournament which ran from 2006 until 2009 and granted the winners entry into the Hopman Cup the following year. In 2008 and 2009 Kazakhstan hosted the event in Astana finishing as the runners-up to Chinese Taipei in 2008 and winning in 2009 to grant them access to the main tournament in Australia for the first time.

Players
This is a list of players who have played for Kazakhstan in the Hopman Cup.

1 Karatantcheva replaced Shvedova after the first tie in 2011 due to a knee injury sustained by Shvedova.

Results

1 In 2010, the mixed doubles dead rubber against Germany was not played.

References

See also
CIS at the Hopman Cup
Soviet Union at the Hopman Cup

Hopman Cup teams
Hopman Cup
Hopman Cup